Zonta van den Goorbergh (born 1 December 2005) is a Dutch Grand Prix motorcycle racer competing in the Moto2 World Championship for RW Racing GP. His father, Jurgen van den Goorbergh is a former MotoGP racer.

Career statistics

Grand Prix motorcycle racing

By season

By class

Races by year
(key) (Races in bold indicate pole position; races in italics indicate fastest lap)

References

External links

2005 births
Living people
Dutch motorcycle racers
Moto2 World Championship riders
Sportspeople from Breda